Maniac Cop 2 is a 1990 American action slasher film directed by William Lustig and written by Larry Cohen. It is the second installment in the Maniac Cop film series. It stars Robert Davi, Claudia Christian, Michael Lerner, and Bruce Campbell, with Robert Z'Dar returning as Matthew Cordell, an undead police officer-turned-serial killer following his own murder.

Maniac Cop 2 was released direct-to-video in 1990, and received mixed-to-positive reviews, with many considering it as an improvement over its predecessor. It was followed by Maniac Cop III: Badge of Silence (1993).

Plot 
After being impaled by a pipe and plunged into a body of water, the now-undead "Maniac Cop" Matthew Cordell acquires a junked police cruiser and restarts his killing spree through New York City. Finding a convenience store in the middle of a robbery, he kills the clerk; the thief is subsequently killed in a shootout with police. As Cordell stalks the streets, his enemies Officers Jack Forrest and Theresa Mallory are put back on duty by Deputy Commissioner Edward Doyle, who has the two undergo a psychiatric evaluation under Officer Susan Riley. While Jack is content that Cordell is dead, Theresa is convinced that Cordell is still alive and plotting his revenge.

At a newsstand, Jack is fatally stabbed by Cordell. In order to protect the memory of Commissioner Pike, the corrupt official who originally framed Cordell, the police refuse to inform the public of the nature of recent events. This, along with her belief that Cordell is alive and killing, prompts Theresa to appear on a talk show to inform the public about Cordell. A traffic cop is murdered by Cordell later while attempting to tow a man's car. The man who was having his car towed is arrested on suspicion on the cop's murder. While en route to a hotel in a taxi, Theresa is joined by Susan, and the two are attacked by Cordell, who kills the cabbie and forces Susan and Theresa off the road. After handcuffing Susan to the steering wheel of a car and sending her into the busy streets, Cordell kills Theresa by snapping her neck. Gaining control of the car, Susan crashes and is found by authorities.

Elsewhere, a stripper named Cheryl is attacked in her apartment by Steven Turkell, who has strangled at least six other exotic dancers. Cordell arrives, murders two officers whom Cheryl called for, and helps Turkell escape. Turkell befriends Cordell and takes him back to his apartment, where Cordell stays for a short while. After Cordell leaves, Turkell visits a strip club, where he is identified by Cheryl to Susan and Detective Lieutenant Sean McKinney. He is arrested and placed in a holding cell.

Cordell breaks into the police station, murders nineteen police officers, and frees Turkell and several unnamed convicts. Using Susan as a hostage, Turkell, Cordell, and another criminal named Joseph Blum hijack a prison bus and head to Sing Sing, where Turkell believes Cordell wants to free all inmates and create an army of criminals. McKinney and Doyle follow, and McKinney convinces Doyle to reopen Cordell's case and rebury his casket with full honors on the assumption that this will appease Cordell.

Cordell gains entry into the prison using Blum's paperwork, and kills a guard for his keys. Shortly after entering death row, Cordell is contacted over the prison PA system by Doyle, who admits to Cordell that he was set up and states that his case has been reopened. After hearing Doyle's announcement, Cordell abandons Turkell, Blum, and Susan and heads deeper into the prison, where he is attacked with a Molotov cocktail by the three inmates who originally mutilated and killed him. While on fire, Cordell kills the three convicts who mutilated him, only to be attacked by Turkell. As Cordell and Turkell fight, the two crash through a wall, fall onto the bus below, and seemingly die when the vehicle explodes.

Some time later, Cordell is buried with full honors alongside 19 other deceased officers he murdered; Susan and McKinney attend his funeral. As Cordell's casket is lowered, McKinney throws Cordell's badge into the grave, leaves with Susan, and monologues about how justice and pressure are the only differences between a cop and a "Maniac Cop". Then the camera slowly and eerily zooms in on Cordell's gravesite. After a few seconds, Cordell's hand unexpectedly bursts through the lid of his casket (in a jump scare) and quickly grabs his badge as the screen cuts to black and the credits roll.

Cast 

 Robert Davi as Lieutenant Sean McKinney
 Claudia Christian as Officer Susan Riley
 Robert Z'Dar as Officer Matt Cordell / The Maniac Cop
 Michael Lerner as Deputy Commissioner Ed Doyle
 Bruce Campbell as Officer Jack W. Forrest Jr.
 Laurene Landon as Officer Theresa Mallory
 Clarence Williams III as Joe Blum
 Leo Rossi as Steven Turkell
 Paula Trickey as Cheryl
 Charles Napier as Lew Brady
 Ángel Salazar as Officer Kirby
 Hank Garrett as Tom O'Henton
 Robert Earl Jones as Harry Bergman
 Danny Trejo as Prisoner
 Sam Raimi as News Reporter
 NYPD Detective Bo Dietl as himself (cameo)

Release

Home media 
Maniac Cop 2 was released direct-to-video in the United States.

Blue Underground gave the film a limited theatrical release in the United States in October 2013, which was followed by the Blu-ray and DVD release on November 19.

Reception 
On Rotten Tomatoes, 60% of 10 critics gave the film a positive review; the average rating was 5.1/10. Variety called Maniac Cop 2 "a thinking man's exploitation film, improving on the 1988 original". TV Guide said the sequel "lacks the element of suspense present in the first film" but "delivers excellent action, [...] some spectacular fire effects and a number of quirky characterizations—a Cohen specialty". Ty Burr rated the film C+ and called it a "brutal, stupid" zombie film in which "the style almost redeems the sleaze". Michael Gingold of Fangoria rated it 3.5/4 stars and called it Lustig's best film. Anthony Arrigo of Dread Central rated it 4/5 stars and wrote, "Maniac Cop 2 embodies all of the excess that made '80s horror sequels so great". Mike Pereira of Bloody Disgusting rated it 4/5 stars and wrote, "Maniac Cop 2 delivers a fresh experience while all along staying true to what fans dig about the original".

Lustig considers Maniac Cop 2 to be his best film, saying that "it was the film [where] I felt as though myself and my crew were really firing on all cylinders. And I think we made a terrific B-movie", and also thinks it's superior to the first Maniac Cop film.

References

External links 
 
 

1990 horror films
1990s Christmas horror films
1990 action thriller films
1990 crime thriller films
1990s slasher films
American action thriller films
American Christmas horror films
American crime thriller films
American supernatural horror films
American independent films
American action horror films
Fictional portrayals of the New York City Police Department
American films about revenge
Films set in New York City
Films set in prison
Films shot in New York City
Films shot in New Jersey
Films shot in Los Angeles
Films about the New York City Police Department
American police detective films
American sequel films
American serial killer films
American slasher films
American zombie films
Films directed by William Lustig
Films scored by Jay Chattaway
Supernatural slasher films
Crime horror films
Maniac Cop (film series)
1990 independent films
Films with screenplays by Larry Cohen
1990s English-language films
1990s American films